Grand 

 Cedric Grand (born 1976), Swiss bobsledder
 Gil Grand (born 1968), Canadian country music singer
 Jean-Pierre Grand (born 1950), French politician
 Otis Grand (born 1950), American blues musician
 Pascale Grand (born 1967), Canadian racewalker
 Sarah Grand (1854-1943), British feminist writer
 Simon Grand (born 1984), English footballer
 Steve Grand (roboticist) (born 1958), English computer scientist
 Steve Grand (born 1990), American singer-songwriter

See also
Le Grand (disambiguation)
Grand (disambiguation)